Pavel Andreyevich Lebedev (born 12 December 1982) is a Russian former pair skater. With Natalia Shestakova, he is the 2004 World Junior Champion. Earlier, he competed with Maria Mukhortova and Svetlana Nikolaeva.

Programs

With Shestakova

With Mukhortova

With Nikolaeva

Competitive highlights

With Shestakova

With Mukhortova

With Nikolaeva

References

External links

Navigation

Russian male pair skaters
Figure skaters from Saint Petersburg
Living people
1982 births
World Junior Figure Skating Championships medalists
Russian LGBT rights activists
Universiade medalists in figure skating
Universiade silver medalists for Russia
Medalists at the 2003 Winter Universiade